Pedro Alves a.k.a. Toonman (born 14 June 1975 in Lisbon) is a Portuguese illustrator. He has edited work in the fields of cartoons, comics, comic strips, caricature and character design. The style is mainly vector cartoons. His work with the Flor de Lis magazine is a benchmark in Scout-related illustrations.

Major works
Cover for Flor de Lis magazine on Totems, Christmas, ACANAC 07
1st prize cartoon in the Amadora comics festival
1st prize comics in DN Jovem contest
 Stuart awards shortlist 2005-IVA, 2006-Homeworker's safety

Major clients
WHO - creative talents agency
Jornal de Noticias
Casa Cláudia
Flor de Lis
BD Jornal
BD Voyeur

External links

Portuguese illustrators
Portuguese artists
1975 births
Living people